The Civil Aviation Accident Investigation Board (JIAAC ) was the civil aviation accident investigation agency of Venezuela. The JIAAC had its headquarters in Chacao, Caracas, Miranda State. Before its closure, it was an organization under the Ministry of Transport and Communications. It was originally the Air Accident Investigation Committee (CIAA). Previously the JIAAC was an independent authority of the Ministry of Public Works and Housing. That Ministry was known as the Ministry of Popular Power for Infrastructure from January 2007 to March 2009, and was previously the Ministry for Infrastructure ( Minfra). Lorllys Ramos Acevedo was the final director of the JIAAC.

Now Venezuela has the Directorate General for the Prevention and Investigation of Aeronautical Accidents, under the Ministry of Aquatic and Air Transport.

See also

 Conviasa Flight 2350
 Santa Bárbara Airlines Flight 518
 West Caribbean Airways Flight 708

References

External links
 Junta Investigadora de Accidentes de Aviación Civil  (Archive)

Aviation organizations based in Venezuela
Government agencies of Venezuela
Venezuela